Terrified may refer to:

Terrified (album), by Quiet Riot, 1993
"Terrified" (Childish Gambino song), 2017
"Terrified" (Katharine McPhee song), 2010
Terrified (film), a 2017 Argentine horror film